Anthology 1984 - 2004 is a compilation of the first 20 years of music by Dirk Serries under his pseudonym Vidna Obmana.

Track listing

Personnel

Vidna Obmana – percussion, electric guitar, vocals, rhythm, electronics, atmosphere, overtone flute, fujara

See also 

 Vidna Obmana
 Dirk Serries

External links
 Projekt: darkwave - vidnaObmana: Anthology 1984 - 2004

References

Vidna Obmana albums
2004 compilation albums